Bud Mitchell is an American former Negro league outfielder who played between 1929 and 1935.

Mitchell attended Chester High School and Lincoln University. He made his Negro leagues debut in 1929 with the Hilldale Club, and played three seasons with Hilldale. Mitchell went on to play for several teams, finishing his career in 1935 with the Columbus Elite Giants.

References

External links
 and Seamheads

Year of birth missing
Place of birth missing
Bacharach Giants players
Baltimore Black Sox players
Columbus Elite Giants players
Hilldale Club players
Philadelphia Stars players
Baseball outfielders